Balian III of Beirut (died 1247) was the Lord of Beirut, the second of his family, from 1236, and a son of the famous "Old Lord" John of Ibelin, by his second wife Melisende of Arsuf. From his father he assumed the leadership of the nobility in the War of the Lombards, fought against the agents of the Emperor Frederick II. 

He was a warrior from an early age. At the Battle of Agridi in 1232, though he was supposed to be in the rearguard with his father and the King of Cyprus, he instead went to the front, beside either Hugh of Ibelin and Anceau of Brie, commanders of the first and second battles. At the battle, Balian won fame defending a pass from the Lombards. A story is told in the Gestes des Chiprois that Balian once struck a Lombard knight so hard that he himself was dismounted. 

Balian led his family in besieging Tyre in 1242. He also had the support of Philip of Novara and Philip of Montfort and he employed mercenaries and galleys in the endeavour. 

Balian of Ibelin, lord of Beirut married Eschiva de Montfaucon, daughter of Walter of Montbéliard and Bourgogne de Lusignan of Cyprus and they had issue:
 Hugue 1231/32–1254/55, married (1250/53) to Marie of Montbéliard.
 John II of Beirut died 1264, married to Alice de la Roche, daughter of Guy I, Duke of Athens.
 Isabelle, married (c. 1250) to Henry I Embriaco de Giblet (died c. 1271).

Ancestry

References

Sources

Marshall, Christopher. Warfare in the Latin East, 1192–1291. Cambridge University Press, 1992.

Christians of the Crusades
Christians of the Barons' Crusade
1247 deaths
House of Ibelin
Year of birth unknown
History of Beirut
13th-century monarchs in the Middle East